María José Mailliard (born 24 January 1991) is a Chilean sprint canoeist.

She participated at the 2018 ICF Canoe Sprint World Championships.

She competed at the 2019 Pan American Games where she won silver medals in the C-1 200 metres and C-2 500 metres events.

She represented Chile at the 2020 Summer Olympics.

References

External links

1991 births
Living people
Chilean female canoeists
ICF Canoe Sprint World Championships medalists in Canadian
Pan American Games medalists in canoeing
Pan American Games silver medalists for Chile
Canoeists at the 2019 Pan American Games
Medalists at the 2019 Pan American Games
Canoeists at the 2020 Summer Olympics
Olympic canoeists of Chile
20th-century Chilean women
21st-century Chilean women
South American Games gold medalists for Chile
South American Games medalists in canoeing
Competitors at the 2018 South American Games
Competitors at the 2022 South American Games